Miss Caribbean UK 2016, the 3rd edition of the Miss Caribbean UK pageant, was held on 3 December 2016 at the Broadway Theatre in Catford London, UK. Amy Harris-Willock crowned her successor, the model, Jodie Hodgson, who was representing Barbados. Thirteen contestants competed for the crown.

References

External links
 "Official Souvenir Brochure 2016". Miss Caribbean UK. Retrieved 19 December 2015.

2016